Adelino Baguio Sitoy (February 6, 1936 – April 15, 2021), also known as Addy Sitoy, was a Filipino politician, lawyer, and Cebuano language advocate from Cebu, Philippines. He served as the Presidential Legislative Liaison Office (PLLO) Secretary under the Duterte administration from September 2016 until his death. He was the elected vice mayor of Cordova, a position from which he resigned at the time of his appointment at PLLO. The Duterte administration in tribute upon his death praised him for facilitating the passage of laws, but some lawmakers allegedly blamed his office for failing to provide timely coordination in forwarding a few pieces of legislation such as the bill for security of tenure (anti-endo) and coconut farmer trust fund, a bill which was vetoed and then later signed into law by Duterte. Sitoy reportedly claimed the office was not invited for meetings, and then he admitted that comments from the executive branch of the government on the bills were relayed late. 

Sitoy was born on February 6, 1936. After he obtained a law degree from University of San Carlos, he attended University of Southern Philippines for a master's degree. He had teaching position in various universities in Cebu and later became the dean of the College of Law of the University of Cebu from 2002 to 2007. From 1963 to 1969, he was Cebu City's prosecutor. He also was voted to Cordova's legislative council, and to the Sangguniang Panlalawigan of Cebu (Cebu Provincial Board) from 1975 to 1984. During the regime of Ferdinand Marcos, he was an assemblyman from 1984 to 1986.  He was elected mayor of Cordova from 2007 to 2016.  

Known for his support for the regional language, Cebuano, he was the president of the writers' group Lubas sa Dagang Bisaya (Ludabi) and a founder of Akademiyang Bisaya, one of the organizations responsible for the publication of Cebuano-English dictionary. 

He died of cardiac arrest on April 15, 2021, aged 85, a few days after he underwent angioplasty and weeks after he was positive with COVID-19.

References

20th-century Filipino lawyers
Filipino academic administrators
1936 births
2021 deaths
Members of the Cebu Provincial Board
Heads of government agencies of the Philippines
Members of the Batasang Pambansa
Mayors of places in Cebu
University of San Carlos alumni
Cebuano writers
Duterte administration cabinet members
Deaths from the COVID-19 pandemic in the Philippines
21st-century Filipino lawyers